Delta Sigma Theta, an international historically Black sorority, was founded on January 13, 1913, at Howard University, and began to expand its membership early on when it chartered Beta Chapter at Wilberforce University in 1914, Gamma Chapter at the University of Pennsylvania in 1918 and Delta Chapter at the University of Iowa in 1919.  Delta Sigma Theta continues to Charter new chapters at the Collegiate and Alumnae levels. Individual Chapters are Chartered, not Founded, as only the Perpetual body was founded, and the founding occurred on January 13, 1913, at Howard University. Delta Sigma Theta has more than 1000 Chapters located in the United States, Canada, England, Japan (Tokyo and Okinawa), Germany, the Virgin Islands, Liberia, Bermuda, Jamaica, The Bahamas, South Korea and Nigeria. The sorority's chapters are organized into seven regions and further subdivided by state.  While initially Alumnae / Graduate Chapters were named using the Greek Alphabet, the perpetual body of Delta Sigma Theta voted at the Twenty-Fourth National Convention, held in Detroit, Michigan on December 26–30, 1956, to abandon this practice.  Following the vote, the Greek Letter names for the Alumnae Chapters are no longer used or recognized by the Grand Chapter. Alumnae Chapters are instead named using their Geographic Location.  This list includes Active, Inactive, Reassigned, and Retired undergraduate Chapters.

Single Letter Chapters

Chapters Beginning With "Alpha"

Chapters Beginning With "Beta"

Chapters Beginning With "Gamma"

Chapters Beginning With "Delta"

Chapters Beginning With "Epsilon"

Chapters Beginning With "Zeta"

Chapters Beginning With "Eta"

Chapters Beginning With "Theta"

Chapters Beginning With "Iota"

Chapters Beginning With "Kappa"

Chapters Beginning With "Lambda"

Chapters Beginning With "Mu"

Chapters Beginning With "Nu"

Chapters Beginning With "Xi"

Chapters Beginning With "Omicron"

Chapters Beginning With "Pi"

Chapters Beginning With "Rho"

Chapters Beginning With "Sigma"

Chapters Beginning With "Tau"

Chapters Beginning With "Upsilon"

Citations

References

 

Lists of chapters of United States student societies by society
Chapters